May Day Protests may refer to:
 1971 May Day Protests in Washington, DC
 New Haven May Day protests, 1970
 2009 May Day protests
 Evil May Day
 May Day Riots of 1919
 Los Angeles May Day mêlée
 2014 May Day protests
 2015 May Day protests
 2017 May Day protests

See also 
 List of demonstrations against corporate globalization